The Falling Season is the seventh solo studio album by American rapper Masta Ace. It was released on May 13, 2016 through M3 Macmil Music/HHV.de. Recording sessions took place at Shelter Island Sound in New York and at BGB Lab in Detroit. Production was handled by KIC Beats, with Richard "Filthy Rich" Ahee and Masta Ace serving as executive producers. It features guest appearances from Pav Bundy, A.G., Beej, Chuck D, Cormega, Deion, Denez Prigent, Hypnotic Brass Ensemble, LT, Nikky Bourbon, Pearl Gates, Queen Heroine, Stricklin, The World's Famous Supreme Team, Torae, Wordsworth and Your Old Droog among others.

As with Masta Ace's previous albums, The Falling Season is a concept album and tells a story of Masta Ace's high school years. It was released on CD, vinyl and cassette tape.

Track listing

Personnel

Duval "Masta Ace" Clear – performer (tracks: 2, 4, 5, 7-9, 11, 13, 14, 16, 18-20, 22, 23), mixing, executive producer
Damion Neal – performer (tracks: 1, 3, 6, 10, 12, 15, 17, 21)
Your Old Droog – performer (track 2)
Fatz Belvedere – performer (tracks: 3, 10, 15)
Paris "Pav Bundy" Wells – performer (tracks: 4, 13)
Carlton "Chuck D" Ridenhour – performer (track 4)
Hypnotic Brass Ensemble – performers (track 4)
Andre "A.G." Barnes – performer (track 5)
Michael Walker Jr. – performer (tracks: 6, 17)
Lynne "LT" Timmes – performer (track 7)
Nikky Bourbon – performer (track 8), overtone voice (track 22)
Peridot "Queen Herowin" Smith – performer (track 9), overtone voice (track 2)
Richard Reilly – performer (track 12)
Vinson "Wordsworth" Johnson – performer (track 13)
Beej Brooks – performer (track 14)
Cory "Cormega" McKay – performer (track 14)
Lauren Sorrentino – performer (track 15)
Lindsey Sorrentino – performer (track 15)
Stephen "Strick" Stricklin – performer (track 16)
Isiah McFadden – performer (track 17)
Torae Carr – performer (track 18)
Dion Jenkins – performer (track 19)
Larry "Sedivine the Mastermind" Price – performer (track 20)
Ronald "JazzyJust" Larkins Jr. – performer (track 20)
Denez Prigent – performer (track 23)
Cesar "Pearl Gates" Perez Jr. – performer (track 23)
Spencer Hinkle – electric upright bass (track 2)
Brenda K. Starr – additional vocals (track 4)
Marlon Saunders – additional vocals (track 4)
Leschea A. Boatwright – additional vocals (tracks: 7, 13)
William "DJ JS-1" Tramontozzi – scratches (tracks: 7, 8)
Shawn Taylor – trumpet (tracks: 9, 23)
Shay Mehrdad – guitar (track 16)
Kinte "Apocalypse" Givens – additional vocals (track 18)
Ryan "KIC Beats" Lucero – piano (track 23), producer
Alex Kasvikis – bass guitar (track 23)
Marissa Licata – violin (track 23)
Richard "Filthy Rich" Ahee – mixing, executive producer
Rick Essig – mastering
Robert "DJ Rob" Alphonse – art direction
Temper – artwork
Zoe Michaela Riess – photography
Florian Roeske – additional photography

References

External links 

2016 albums
Masta Ace albums